Victor Shore (11 February 1897 – 1981) was an English footballer who played in the Football League for Sunderland and Stoke.

Career
Shore was born in Wednesbury and played for Deans Works before joining Sunderland in 1919. However, despite scoring on his debut against Preston North End in April 1920 he was unable to break into the first team and left for Stoke in 1921. He again failed to make an impact play just three matches in 1921–22 and was released from the Victoria Ground at the end of the season. He went on to play for Brierley Hill Alliance, Cottage Spring and Whitburn.

Career statistics
Source:

References

English footballers
Sunderland A.F.C. players
Stoke City F.C. players
English Football League players
1897 births
1981 deaths
Association football forwards
Sportspeople from Wednesbury